Ervin Gashi (born 27 August 1990) is a Swiss footballer of Kosovan descent, who plays as an centre-back for Swiss club Prishtina Bern. He is also manager of the Grasshoppers U16.

Coaching career

Grasshoppers U16
On 30 May 2020, the Grasshoppers appointed Gashi as their manager of under-16 team.

References

External links

1990 births
Living people
21st-century Swiss people
Swiss men's footballers
Swiss people of Kosovan descent
Swiss people of Albanian descent
21st-century Albanian sportspeople
Association football central defenders
Swiss Challenge League players
Swiss Super League players
FC Thun players
2. Liga Interregional players
FC Köniz players
Swiss 1. Liga (football) players
FC Naters players
FC Solothurn players
Swiss football managers